Gaysweek was a weekly gay and lesbian newspaper based in New York City printed from 1977 until 1979. Considered the city's first mainstream weekly lesbian and gay newspaper, it was founded by Alan Bell in 1977 as an 8-page single-color tabloid and finished its run in 1979 as a 24-page two-color publication. It featured articles, letter, art and poetry. It was, at the time, only one of three weekly publications geared towards gay people. It was also the first mainstream gay publication published by an African-American (Alan Bell).

Background
Gaysweek was New York City's first mainstream weekly lesbian and gay newspaper. It was founded by Alan Bell in 1977. Gaysweek began as an 8-page single-color tabloid and when it ceased publication in 1979 after 104 issues, it had grown to a 24-page two-color publication. Its monthly arts supplement, Gaysweek Arts and Letters, was edited by Byrne Fone. During its run, it was one of only three gay weeklies in the world and the only mainstream gay publication owned by an African American. A portion of Gaysweek archives are housed at Cornell University Library, Division of Rare and Manuscript Collections.

Although it was eventually granted, Gaysweeks application to the U.S. Patent and Trademark Office for registration of the Gaysweek trademark, was opposed by Newsweek, Inc. because, according to attorneys for the publication, they are similar "both phonetically and in appearance." Newsweek later sued Gaysweek for trademark infringement.

Gaysweek made news briefly in 2002, when the Roman Catholic Archdiocese of Boston, in relation to a lawsuit filed against it by the attorney of a man who accused Boston-based Father Paul Shanley of repeated rape, turned over a copy of the February 12, 1979 issue of Gaysweek which included an article titled "Men & Boys" that described a meeting in Boston in which Shanley defended a relationship between a man and a boy.

Contributors

Notable writers
Eric Bentley
Perry Brass
Robert Chesley
Daniel Curzon
Martin Duberman
Harvey Fierstein
Robert Patrick
Felice Picano
David Rothenberg
Edmund White
George Whitmore

See also
 LGBT culture in New York City
 Out Front Colorado, the third oldest independent LGBT publication in the United States, as well as the second oldest in circulation (1976)
 Bay Area Reporter, the second oldest in circulation (1971)
 Washington Blade, the oldest independent U.S. LGBT publication in circulation (1969)

Defunct
 Gay Community News (Boston) (published 1973–1992 in Boston)

References 

LGBT-related newspapers published in the United States
Weekly newspapers published in the United States
LGBT history in New York City
Defunct weekly newspapers